Two ships of the United States Navy have borne the name USS Carson City, named in honor of the city of Carson City, Nevada.

  is a 

United States Navy ship names